Kim Jong-hwan (2 September 1923 – 23 August 2022) was a South Korean military officer and politician. An independent, he served as Minister of the Interior from 1979 to 1980.

Kim died on 23 August 2022, at the age of 98.

References

1923 births
2022 deaths
South Korean politicians
Chairmen of the Joint Chiefs of Staff (South Korea)
Republic of Korea Army personnel
Government ministers of South Korea
Interior ministers of South Korea
Korea Military Academy alumni
South Korean military personnel of the Korean War
Korean military personnel of the Vietnam War
People from Gyeonggi Province